Castiglione Messer Marino (locally Lu Cuaštegliàune ) is a comune and town in the province of Chieti in the Abruzzo region of central-eastern Italy.

It is the birthplace of race car driver Juan Manuel Fangio's father, Loreto Fangio.

See also
Castelfraiano

References

External links
Official website

 
Cities and towns in Abruzzo